Raphitoma locardi is a species of sea snail, a marine gastropod mollusk in the family Raphitomidae.

References

 Pusateri F., Giannuzzi-Savelli R. & Oliverio M. 2013. A revision of the Mediterranean Raphitomidae 2: On the sibling species Raphitoma lineolata (B.D.D., 1883) and Raphitoma smriglioi n. sp. Iberus, 31(1): 11-20 page(s): 18; note: replacement name for Clathurella cylindrica Locard & Caziot, 1899, non Pease, 1860

External links
 Locard A. & Caziot E. (1900-1901). Les coquilles marines des côtes de Corse. Annales de la Société Linnéenne de Lyon, 46: 193-274 [1900; 47: 1-80, 159-291]
 Biolib.cz: Raphitoma locardi

locardi
Gastropods described in 2013